Gretchen Frances Wilson (born June 26, 1973) is an American country music singer and songwriter. She made her debut in March 2004 with the Grammy Award-winning single "Redneck Woman", a number-one hit on the Billboard country charts. The song served as the lead-off single of her debut album, Here for the Party. Wilson followed this album one year later with All Jacked Up, the title track of which became the highest-debuting single for a female country artist upon its 2005 release. A third album, One of the Boys, was released in 2007.

Overall, Wilson has charted 13 singles on the Billboard country charts, of which five have reached top ten: the number one "Redneck Woman", as well as "Here for the Party" (#3, 2004), "When I Think About Cheatin'" (#4, 2004), "Homewrecker" (#2, 2005), and "All Jacked Up" (#8, 2005). The album Here for the Party was certified 5× multi-platinum by the RIAA for sales of five million copies, while All Jacked Up was certified platinum. She has sold over 8.2 million records worldwide.

Country music career

Here for the Party

Wilson signed with Epic Records in 2003 and recorded Here for the Party within the year. Her first single, "Redneck Woman", was released in early 2004 and reached the top of the Hot Country Songs charts and No. 22 on the Billboard Hot 100. This song was also the first number one country hit by a female in two years. The success of "Redneck Woman" prompted an earlier-than-planned release for Here for the Party, and it debuted at No. 1 on the Billboard country chart. It reached No. 2 on the Billboard 200 and Billboard Internet album sales charts. She performed as a support artist for Brooks & Dunn and Montgomery Gentry.

She released the title track to her debut album as the second single. It peaked at No. 3 on the Billboard country chart. Two other songs were released as singles, and both reached the top 10. Released in markets outside the U.S., the album hit No. 2 on the Australian country charts (behind Kasey Chambers) and the top 50 of the Australian charts. Here for the Party was certified 5× multi-platinum by the RIAA.

All Jacked Up
On September 27, 2005, Wilson released her second album, All Jacked Up, which peaked at No. 1 on both the Top 200 and Country album charts and sold 1 million copies. The title track debuted at No. 21 on the Hot Country Songs charts, setting a record for the highest debut ever made by a female artist.

This record was broken in late 2007 by Carrie Underwood's "So Small". Despite its high debut, however, "All Jacked Up" peaked at No. 8 on Hot Country Songs after only eight chart weeks. It was also used, at one time, by ESPN as the opening theme for its baseball coverage.  Three more singles were released from All Jacked Up: "I Don't Feel Like Loving You Today", "Politically Uncorrect" (a duet with Merle Haggard) and "California Girls", none of which reached Top 20 on the country charts. These latter two singles were issued on Columbia Records, due to the closure of Epic Records's Nashville division.

Wilson's "I Don't Feel Like Loving You Today" was nominated for two Grammy Awards: Best Female Country Vocal Performance, and Best Country Song. In 2006, Wilson contributed a well-received cover of  Kris Kristofferson's "Sunday Mornin' Coming Down" on the tribute CD The Pilgrim: A Celebration of Kris Kristofferson.

One of the Boys

On May 15, 2007, Wilson released her third album, One of the Boys. The album debuted at No. 5 on the Top 200 and at No. 1 on the Country album chart. After 10 weeks, it exited the Billboard Top 200, having sold 178,220 copies at that point. "Come to Bed" (a duet with John Rich) and the title track, the first two singles released, both peaked in the 30s on the country charts, while the third and final single ("You Don't Have to Go Home") failed to reach the Top 40.

I Got Your Country Right Here
On July 14, 2008, Wilson released a new single, "Don't Do Me No Good". This song was intended to be the lead-off single to a fourth studio album, but it failed to reach the Top 40 and the album was delayed. It was followed in 2009 by two more singles, "The Earrings Song" and "If I Could Do It All Again," neither of which entered the charts. Wilson then issued a press release on July 28, 2009, stating that she would be parting with Sony Music Nashville. Wilson then launched Redneck Records, her own record label. "Work Hard, Play Harder" was released to radio on October 26, 2009 as the first single from the label and her fourth studio album, I Got Your Country Right Here, was finally released on March 30, 2010. Her former label, Columbia Nashville, released her first Greatest Hits album on January 19, 2010, to finish off her recording contract.

On July 31, 2008, The Black Crowes filed a lawsuit against Wilson for copyright violation, alleging that her song "Work Hard, Play Harder" copied the Crowes song "Jealous Again". Also included in the suit were her label Sony BMG, her publishing company, and the cable network TNT, which had been using the song in commercials. The lawsuit was eventually settled out of court for an undisclosed sum and Black Crowes members Chris and Rich Robinson were given songwriting credits.

Right on Time, Under the Covers and Christmas in My Heart
Wilson released an album of original songs titled Right on Time on April 2, 2013. It was led by the single "Still Rollin'". A collection of rock covers titled Under the Covers was released on June 4, 2013. Wilson released her first Christmas album, Christmas in My Heart, on October 8, 2013.

Other ventures

Rock music
While a country singer first and foremost, Gretchen Wilson has also attracted favorable attention for her rendition of classic rock songs by Heart – a group which she sees as "one of the biggest influences on my musical career".

She has appeared several times on the same stage as lead singer Ann Wilson and guitarist Nancy Wilson, once describing the experience as "beyond a dream come true".

She has sung "Straight On", "Crazy on You", and – most notably – "Barracuda", which she performed with Alice in Chains and Nancy Wilson on guitar at the 2007 VH1 Rock Honors. She also performed, with Randy Bachman, the classic Who track "Who Are You" on the album Who Are You – An All Star Tribute to the Who. She performed on Buckcherry's single "The Feeling Never Dies" (from the album Rock 'n' Roll), which was released January 29, 2016.

Activism

Politics
Gretchen Wilson sang the National Anthem (blended with a voice-over of the Pledge of Allegiance) to a national audience at the Republican National Convention on September 3, 2008, later describing this as a "once-in-a-lifetime" experience at a "historic moment." Wilson and her band also performed during a rally for Republican presidential candidate John McCain and vice-presidential candidate Sarah Palin at Lunken Airport in Cincinnati, Ohio, on October 22, 2008, to a crowd of approximately 12,000 supporters. Palin started the rally by exclaiming that she couldn't wait to get Wilson's autograph. Wilson played a version of the Heart song "Barracuda" for Palin.

Charities and public service
Wilson has been active in support for children's charities, adult education, and the fight against obesity. Initiatives to date include:
 (1) Raising over $1.5 million through benefit performances for children's charities, such as St. Jude Children's Research Hospital and the Make-a-Wish Foundation.
 (2) Serving as national spokesperson for Country Bands Together, a national obesity education and counseling/support campaign sponsored by Allergan.
 (3) Advocacy for adult education, including testimony before Congress on the value and importance of support for adult learners. Wilson dropped out of high school while in 9th grade but gained her GED in 2008 through an adult education college.

Sports
In April 2010, Wilson released a customized version of "Work Hard, Play Harder" in honor of the National Hockey League's Nashville Predators, with reworked lyrics mentioning the team and its fans.
She also sponsors a women's softball team in Pierron, Illinois.

Legal issues
On July 31, 2008, The Black Crowes filed a lawsuit against Wilson for copyright violation, alleging that her song "Work Hard, Play Harder" copied the Crowes song "Jealous Again". Also included in the suit were her label Sony BMG, her publishing company, and the cable network TNT, which had been using the song in commercials. The lawsuit was eventually settled out of court for an undisclosed sum and Black Crowes members Chris and Rich Robinson were given songwriting credits.

On August 21, 2018, Wilson was arrested at Bradley International Airport in Windsor Locks, Connecticut. Connecticut State Police arrived at the airport after reports of a minor disturbance. Police arrested Wilson after she reportedly became belligerent during their on-tarmac interview. Wilson was charged with breach of peace and her bond was set at $1,000.

Awards
2005 CMA Female Vocalist of the Year
2004 ACM Top Female Vocalist
2004 ACM Top New Artist
2004 CMA Horizon Award

Grammy Awards history

Discography

Studio albums
Here for the Party (2004)
All Jacked Up (2005)
One of the Boys (2007)
I Got Your Country Right Here (2010)
Right on Time (2013)
Under the Covers (2013)
Ready to Get Rowdy (2017)

References

External links

Gretchen Wilson profile, cmt.com

1973 births
American acoustic guitarists
American country guitarists
American country singer-songwriters
American women country singers
Record producers from Illinois
American women singer-songwriters
Columbia Records artists
Grammy Award winners
Singer-songwriters from Illinois
Living people
People from Bond County, Illinois
Epic Records artists
Illinois Republicans
Guitarists from Illinois
21st-century American women singers
Country musicians from Illinois
American women record producers
21st-century American women guitarists
21st-century American guitarists
21st-century American singers